is a former Japanese football player. He played for Japan national team. His brother Satoshi Kajino is also former footballer.

Club career
Kajino was born in Aichi Prefecture on July 11, 1960. After graduating from Tokyo University of Agriculture, he joined Yanmar Diesel in 1983. The club won 1983 and 1984 JSL Cup. From 1988, his brother Satoshi Kajino joined Yanmar and they played together. In 1992, he moved to J1 League club Gamba Osaka. In 1994, he moved to Japan Football League club Kashiwa Reysol. In 1994, the club won the 2nd place and was promoted to J1 League. He retired in 1995.

National team career
On June 2, 1988, Kajino debuted for Japan national team against China. In 1989, he played at 1990 World Cup qualification. He played 9 games and scored 1 goal for Japan until 1989.

Club statistics

National team statistics

References

External links

Japan National Football Team Database

1960 births
Living people
Tokyo University of Agriculture alumni
Association football people from Aichi Prefecture
Japanese footballers
Japan international footballers
Japan Soccer League players
J1 League players
Japan Football League (1992–1998) players
Cerezo Osaka players
Gamba Osaka players
Kashiwa Reysol players
Association football defenders